Haller Creek is a stream in Stevens County, Washington, in the United States. Haller Creek was named for Thomas Haller, an early settler.

See also
List of rivers of Washington

References

Rivers of Stevens County, Washington
Rivers of Washington (state)